The Warman station is a former railway station in Warman, Saskatchewan. It was built by the Canadian Northern Railway along the east-west Canadian Northern Railway line (running from Humboldt to North Battleford) at the intersection with the Canadian Pacific Railway north–south line (running from Regina to Prince Albert). The -storey, stucco-clad, wood-frame train station, was originally located at the intersection of two railway lines. The station building was moved to its current location in 1942 when its use as a station was discontinued; the building is now used as a seniors drop in centre.  The building was designated a Municipal Heritage Property in 2004.

The original name of the town was Diamond, because the crossing of the two railway lines created a diamond shape. Soon the name of the town site was changed to Warman, named after Cy Warman (1855–1914), a journalist who followed and recorded the construction of the Canadian National Railway.

References 

Canadian National Railway stations in Saskatchewan
Canadian Northern Railway stations in Saskatchewan
Railway stations closed in 1942
Railway stations in Canada opened in 1907
Disused railway stations in Canada